Empires of Sand is a 1999 novel by American writer David W. Ball. It tells the story of two cousins who grow up together in Paris but are separated during the Franco-Prussian War. The second half of the novel concerns their adventures in French Algeria, one cousin living with a Tuareg tribe, the other a French lieutenant on the real-life Flatters Expedition, an ill-fated mission initiated by the French government in 1881 to survey a railway route through the Hoggar region of the Sahara desert.  Most of the expedition's members were slaughtered by the Tuareg.

Tuareg
1999 American novels
American historical novels
Novels set in France
Novels set in Algeria